Asaphocrita busckiella is a moth in the family Blastobasidae. It is found in North America, including Maryland, Maine, New Brunswick, Ontario, Quebec and Tennessee.

References

Moths described in 1910
busckiella